Sir John Cavendish (c. 1346 – 15 June 1381) was an English judge and politician from Cavendish, Suffolk, England. He and the village gave the name Cavendish to the aristocratic families of the Dukedoms of Devonshire, Newcastle and Portland.

Biography
John Cavendish was descended from the Norman Robert de Guernon, who lived during the reign of Henry I and who gave a large amount of property to the Abbey of Gloucester. Robert's son, Roger de Gernon, of Grimston Hall, in Trimley St Martin, Suffolk, married the heiress of John Potton of Cavendish and obtained a landed estate in the lordship and manor of Cavendish. In consequence, his four sons exchanged their father's name for that of the estate each inherited. Until about 1500, this family are recorded as Gernon alias Cavendish.

Sir John Cavendish married Alice de Odingsells, became a lawyer and was appointed as a Justice of the Common Pleas in 1371 and Chief Justice of the King's Bench in 1372. 

On 15 June 1381, he was murdered by rebels during the Peasants' Revolt at Bury St Edmunds.

Notes

External links
Stirnet: GZmisc01 (shows Cavendish's place in the de Gernon family) 
Stirnet: Cavendish01  (shows Cavendish as the patriarch of the Cavendish family) 

1340s births
1381 deaths

Year of birth uncertain
John Cavendish
Chancellors of the University of Cambridge
Justices of the Common Pleas
Lord chief justices of England and Wales
People from the Borough of St Edmundsbury
Knights Bachelor